Römerberg (also spelled as Roemerberg) is a public space in Frankfurt, Germany. It is located in front of the Römer building complex, seat of the Frankfurt city administration since the 15th century. As the site of numerous imperial coronations, trade fairs and Christmas markets, the square is the historic heart of the medieval Altstadt (old town) and today a popular tourist destination. 

Paulsplatz, another historic square, is to the north. The Old St Nicholas Church and Historical Museum are to the south. On the west side of the square is the reconstructed Römer medieval building. To the east is the Dom-Römer Project, and beyond that is Frankfurt Cathedral.

Römerberg is a major location for the outdoor Frankfurt Christmas Market.

It was the site of a Nazi book burning in 1933.

References

External links

Squares in Frankfurt
Frankfurt-Altstadt